John Thomas Cope (1880–1931) was an English footballer who played in the Football League for Chesterfield Town.

References

1880 births
1931 deaths
English footballers
Association football goalkeepers
English Football League players
Chesterfield F.C. players
Portsmouth F.C. players
Sunderland A.F.C. players